Barbarian Queen (also known as Queen of the Naked Steel) is a 1985 American-Argentine fantasy film starring Lana Clarkson, directed by Héctor Olivera and written by Howard R. Cohen. The film premiered in April 1985 in the United States.  It was executive produced by Roger Corman, and it was the third in a series of ten movies that Corman produced in Argentina during the 1980s.

Plot 
A peaceful barbarian village prepares to celebrate the wedding of Queen Amethea (Lana Clarkson) to Prince Argan (Frank Zagarino). During preparations for the wedding ceremony, the forces of Lord Arrakur (Arman Chapman) attack the village. After gang-raping Amethea's younger sister, Taramis (Dawn Dunlap), the attackers take Prince Argan and Taramis as prisoners, along with several others. The remaining villagers are slaughtered. Queen Amethea, her handmaiden Estrild (Katt Shea) and the female warrior Tiniara (Susana Traverso) survive the attack and set out for Arrakur's city to rescue the prisoners and seek revenge for the destruction of their village.

Along the way, the three women come across a small encampment of Arrakur's forces. Amethea and Tiniara ambush and kill the men, discovering Taramis captive inside the camp, who has seemingly been traumatized by her experience and acts withdrawn and delusional.

On the outskirts of Arrakur's realm, the women meet members of an underground resistance force who agree to help smuggle Amethea's party into the city, but refuse to take up arms with them against the tyrannical Arrakur. Inside the city gates, Amethea discovers Argan and the other men taken from her village are being forced to fight as gladiators in the arena at the center of town. Meanwhile, Taramis notices Arrakur leading a procession of troops into his palace and approaches him. Arrakur recognizes Taramis from the camp and allows her to accompany him inside, while in another part of town, Estrild is attacked and raped by two of Arrakur's guards. Amethea and Tiniara come to her defense, but the women are overpowered and taken prisoner.

Estrild is made into one of the harem girls who serve the desires of the gladiators, where she is reunited with Argan, telling him of their failed rescue attempt. Amethea and Tiniara are interrogated separately; Tiniara dies in an escape attempt, while Amethea is sent to the dungeon to be tortured.

Arrakur and his new concubine Taramis visit Amethea in the dungeon, where she has been stripped naked save for a leather collar and thong, to find her being stretched on the rack by the chief torturer (Tony Middleton). Taramis pretends to not know Amethea, while Arrakur demands information about the rebels who helped Amethea into the city. Amethea refuses to speak, and Arrakur demands answers by the morning, taking his leave. Meanwhile, Argan, the other gladiators, and Estrild plot an uprising against Arrakur.

The torturer later rapes Amethea, but she uses her feminine strength to squeeze his manhood painfully during the assault, forcing him to release her from the rack, whereupon Amethea hurls him into a pool of acid and escapes the dungeon.

Finding Estrild, the two women flee the castle and regroup with the rebels, who agree to help in the planned overthrow of Arrakur's forces led by Argan during the gladiatorial games. Amethea and the rebels join with the gladiators in the attack.  Amethea fights Arrakur in one-on-one combat during the melee, but is defeated and disarmed by him.  Before Arrakur can deliver the killing blow, however, Taramis stabs him in the back, killing him. Amethea and Argan are reunited and celebrate the liberation of the city from Arrakur's tyranny.

Cast 

 Lana Clarkson as Amethea
 Katt Shea as Estrild
 Frank Zagarino as Argan
 Dawn Dunlap as Taramis
 Susana Traverso as Tiniara
 Víctor Bó as Strymon
 Arman Chapman as Arrakur
 Andrea Barbieri as Zoraida (as Andrea Barbizon)
 Tony Middleton as Zohar
 Andrea Scriven as Dariac
 Robert Carson as Shibdiz
 Matilde Mur as Eunuco
 Eddie Pequenino as Vendedor (as Eddie Little)
 Patrick Duggan as Shaman
 Lucy Tiller as Orellia
 Ivan Green as Karax
 Theodore McNabney as Cerus (as Theo McNabney)
 Richard R. Jordan as Vanir
 John Head as Alfana
 Daniel Seville as Kantaka
 Eva Donnelly as Ciega

Production 
The film was one of the first from Corman's new company, Concorde.

Barbarian Queen was filmed in Don Torcuato, Argentina by director Héctor Olivera as part of a nine-picture deal between Olivera's Aires Productions and Roger Corman’s U.S.-based Concorde-New Horizons. Corman was looking to produce low-budget sword-and-sorcery films to capitalize on the success of Conan the Barbarian (1982), while Olivera sought to fund more personal film projects via the profits from his deal with Corman. Lana Clarkson, who had appeared in a supporting role as an amazonian warrior in the previous Aires-Concorde coproduction Deathstalker, was cast in the lead as Amethea. Clarkson performed all of her own stunts in the picture.

Release 
Barbarian Queen had a limited theatrical release on April 26, 1985. Vestron Video originally released two versions of the film on VHS: the R-rated theatrical cut, and an unrated edition that contained an extended version of the dungeon sequence. All subsequent DVD releases only contained the R-rated cut. The Shout!Factory DVD release contains the unrated material as a bonus feature.

Reception 
B-movie critic Joe Bob Briggs gave the film a tongue-in-cheek positive review, writing, "It's no Conan the Barbarian II, but it's got what it takes, namely: Forty-six breasts, including two on the male lead. Thirty-one dead bodies. Heads roll. Head spills. Three gang rapes. Women in chains. Orgy. Slave-girl sharing. One bird's-nest bra. The diabolical garbonza torture. Sword fu. Torch fu. Thigh fu (you have to see it to believe it)."

Roman Martel of DVD Verdict wrote that the film is enjoyable but problematic for its misogyny.  R. L. Shaffer of IGN called it an unintentionally funny Conan the Barbarian ripoff.

TV Guide rated it 2/5 stars and wrote that despite the film's exploitative content, Olivera "inject[s] some style and pace to the rather silly goings-on".

Stuart Galbraith IV of DVD Talk wrote that the film "isn't all that terrible" and appeals to its target audience.

Controversy 
Several critics have commented upon the ambiguity of the film's seemingly feminist narrative and the exploitative nature of its many scenes of female rape, nudity, and bondage. Variety’s review of the film suggested the "Concept of female warriors besting male opponents on the battlefield is unconvincing as presented, with the gals more effective as sex objects…Emphasis on rape and torture is overdone." In The Modern Amazons: Warrior Women On-Screen, Dominique Mainon and James Ursini note the film follows a "pseudo-feminine empowerment storyline…In the course of the quest, however, Amethea is caught, stripped down to a pair of thong panties, and bound to a torture device for an unusually long portion of the movie." That the movie's centerpiece is the extended sequence of the supposedly empowered Amethea's topless, BDSM-inflected torture/interrogation has prompted readings of the film as "a delicate postfeminist balance of three discordant elements: a timid rape-and-bondage spectacle, an incoherent feminism, and a very patriarchal plot structure...a feminist narrative arc ostensibly motivates rape imagery."

Rikke Schubart suggests the culmination of the dungeon sequence – in which Amethea literally crushes the torturer's penis with her pelvic muscles – represents a genuine "feminist dislocation" of gender codes, which takes images "of the female rape-victim as weak and helpless and relocates them…as rape-victim being dangerous and lethal." However, Schubart's discussion also implies that the feminism is at least partially mitigated by the sequence's eroticized use of bondage imagery and the objectified presentation of Clarkson's nudity: "Men have no problem identifying with men as victims and women as castrators if this happens in an erotic context where it is obvious that the woman is there to be looked at."

Sequels

Barbarian Queen II 
A follow-up film, Barbarian Queen II: The Empress Strikes Back was billed as a sequel, but actually neither the plot nor the characters had anything to do with the original film, except for Lana Clarkson starring again in the title role , and the inclusion of a protracted sequence reminiscent of the first film, with Clarkson's character princess Athalia  who is implied to be the Reincarnation of Amethea  being captured, stripped, and tortured on a rack.

Principal photography took place in Mexico in 1988; however the film was not released in the U.S. until 1992, when it went straight-to-video.

Wizards of the Lost Kingdom II
Lana Clarkson reprised the role of Amethea as a supporting character in the PG-rated Wizards of the Lost Kingdom II (1989), which features recycled footage of battle scenes from Barbarian Queen. Despite this, there is no apparent connection to the plot of Barbarian Queen, and the Amethea that appears in Wizards of the Lost Kingdom 2 is arguably not the same character that Clarkson played in Barbarian Queen.

Proposed third film
In 1990 it was announced that Barbarian Queen III: Revenge of the She-King would film in Bulgaria; however the project was never completed.

Legacy 
Roger Corman reportedly claimed in later years that the title character was an inspiration for Xena: Warrior Princess.

References

External links 
 
 
 film page at Lana Clarkson website
 Barbarian Queen II review at Entertainment Weekly
 Barbarian Queen II at TCMDB

1985 films
1985 fantasy films
American fantasy adventure films
Argentine fantasy adventure films
1980s Spanish-language films
English-language Argentine films
1980s English-language films
Films scored by Christopher Young
Films directed by Héctor Olivera
Films about rape
American multilingual films
Argentine multilingual films
1985 multilingual films
Spanish-language American films
Films shot in Argentina
1980s American films